Mohd Syazwan bin Zulkifly (born 20 May 1987) is a Malaysian actor who primarily worked on television and film.

Filmography

Film

TV series

Telemovie

Awards and nominations

References

1987 births
Living people
Malaysian Muslims
Malaysian people of Malay descent
People from Kuala Lumpur
21st-century Malaysian male actors
Malaysian male actors
Malaysian male film actors
Malaysian male television actors